Jagdish Sonkar (born 1 September 1967) is an Indian politician and a member of 14th, 15th, 16th & 17th Legislative Assembly, Uttar Pradesh of India. He represents the Machhlishahr constituency in Jaunpur district of Uttar Pradesh.

Personal life
Sonkar was born on 1 September 1967 to Dayaram Sonkar in Dhanupur of Jaunpur district of Uttar Pradesh. He graduated from Sampurnanand Sanskrit Vishwavidyalaya. He married Geet Sonkar on 23 May 1986, with whom he has a son. He is an agriculturalist and industrialist by profession.

Political career
Jagdish Sonkar contested Uttar Pradesh Assembly Election as Samajwadi Party candidate and defeated his close contestant Anita Rawat from Bharatiya Janata Party with a margin of 4,179 votes.

Posts held

References

1967 births
Living people
Uttar Pradesh MLAs 2017–2022
Samajwadi Party politicians from Uttar Pradesh
People from Jaunpur district
Uttar Pradesh MLAs 2002–2007
Uttar Pradesh MLAs 2007–2012
Uttar Pradesh MLAs 2012–2017